Hans-Thomas Hengelbrock (born June 9, 1958) is a German violinist, musicologist, stage director and conductor.

Born in Wilhelmshaven, Hengelbrock studied the violin with Rainer Kussmaul.  He started his career in Würzburg and Freiburg im Breisgau.  He worked as an assistant to Witold Lutosławski, Mauricio Kagel and Antal Doráti and played with ensembles such as the Concentus Musicus Wien.  In 1985, he cofounded the Freiburger Barockorchester, where he worked as a violinist and a leader of the ensemble.

In 1991, Hengelbrock founded the Balthasar Neumann Chor in Freiburg.  Subsequently, in 1995, he established the Balthasar Neumann Ensemble as a parallel orchestra with its namesake choir, to perform works from Baroque to contemporary music in Historically informed performances.  He continues to work both Balthasar Neumann ensembles regularly.  From 1995 to 1999, he was the first artistic director of the Deutsche Kammerphilharmonie Bremen.  He was music director of the Volksoper Wien from 2000 to 2003.  In 2001, he founded the "Feldkirch Festival" in Feldkirch, Vorarlberg, and served as its artistic director until 2006.

In 2011, Hengelbrock became chief conductor of the NDR Symphony Orchestra in 2011.  During his tenure, the orchestra took up new residence at the new Elbphilharmonie concert hall in Hamburg, and changed its name to the NDR Elbphilharmonie Orchestra.  In June 2017, the orchestra announced that Hengelbrock is to conclude his tenure with the ensemble at the close of the 2018–2019 season.  In December 2017, Hengelbrock expressed his displeasure with the timing of the announcement of his  designated successor, Alan Gilbert, within the same month as the original announcement of the previously scheduled conclusion of his tenure.  Hengelbrock thus announced his intention to stand down as chief conductor of the NDR Elbphilharmonie Orchestra at the end of the 2017–2018 season, one season earlier than originally planned.

Selected recordings
 Festa teatrale : carnival in Venice & Florence – Pietro Antonio Giramo, Giovanni Legrenzi, Claudio Monteverdi, Francesco Lambardi, Diego Ortiz, Orazio Vecchi, Salamone Rossi, Tarquinio Merula, Giovanni Giacomo Gastoldi – Balthasar-Neumann-Chor, Balthasar-Neumann-Ensemble, Deutsche Harmonia Mundi 2000
 Music For San Marco In Venice – Claudio Monteverdi, Giovanni Gabrieli, Francesco Cavalli, Giovanni Croce, Alessandro Grandi, Biagio Marini, Claudio Merulo – Balthasar-Neumann-Ensemble, Balthasar-Neumann-Choir
 Aus der Notenbibliothek von Johann Sebastian Bach Vol. 1 (From the music library of Johann Sebastian Bach) – Tomaso Albinoni, Francesco Conti, Pietro Locatelli, George Frideric Handel, Johann Sebastian Bach – Sibylla Rubens, Balthasar-Neumann-Ensemble, Hänssler Classic, 2002
 From The Music Library Of Johann Sebastian Bach Vol. 2: Pachelbel, J. S. Bach, J. C. Kerll CD 2005
 Mozart: Il re pastore – Annette Dasch, Marlis Petersen, Krešimir Špicer, Arpiné Rahdjian, Andreas Karasiak, Balthasar-Neumann-Ensemble, Deutsche Grammophon, DVD 2006

References

External links
  
 'Der Chefdirigent im Porträt'.  NDR, 19 June 2017

German male conductors (music)
German classical violinists
Male classical violinists
German male violinists
German performers of early music
German musicologists
1958 births
Living people
People from Wilhelmshaven
Musicians from Freiburg im Breisgau
Herbert von Karajan Music Prize winners
Recipients of the Order of Merit of Baden-Württemberg
21st-century German conductors (music)
21st-century German male musicians
21st-century classical violinists